Sanni Sari Abacha (26 October 1978 – 3 October 2013) was a Nigerian football defender who played for Kwara United F.C.
The cause of death is unknown

Career 
He began his career 1996 by Shooting Stars F.C. before moving in January 2001 to Kwara United F.C. After 17 months with Kwara United F.C., he was transferred to Enyimba International F.C. and later moved then to Sharks F.C. in July 2002. In January 2007 he turned back to his former team Kwara United F.C.

References

External links
 

1978 births
2013 deaths
Nigerian footballers
Nigeria international footballers
Sharks F.C. players
Association football defenders
Enyimba F.C. players
Kwara United F.C. players